Playing the Game is a 1918 American silent comedy drama film directed by Victor Schertzinger and written by Julien Josephson and R. Cecil Smith. The film stars Charles Ray, Doris May, Harry L. Rattenberry, Robert McKim, William Elmer, and Leota Lorraine. The film was released on May 5, 1918, by Paramount Pictures. It is not known whether the film currently survives, and it may be a lost film.

Plot
As described in a film magazine, believing that killed a professional dancer in a cafe brawl, Larry Prentiss (Ray) along with his valet Hodges (Elmer) flee to the west to where he owns a ranch. The two are waylaid, robbed of their clothes, and set adrift. In this condition they are picked up by the foreman of Larry's ranch, Flash Purdy (McKim). Larry, wanting to make good on his merits, refuses to make known his identity. Hardships follow in which Larry incurs the enmity of Flash Purdy. Larry later saves the ranch payroll during a running gun fight and in the midst of a hand-to-hand struggle learns that Moya Shannon (May), daughter of the ranch manager, loves him. In the days that follow he squares his account with Purdy, but his adventure comes to a close when his identity becomes known after he receives a telegram from his uncle.

Cast 
Charles Ray as Larry Prentiss
Doris May as Moya Shannon
Harry L. Rattenberry as Matt Shannon 
Robert McKim as 'Flash' Jim Purdy
William Elmer as Hodges 
Leota Lorraine as 'Babe' Fleur de Lis
Charles Perley as Hickey Trent
Melbourne MacDowell as Jeremiah Prentiss

Reception
Like many American films of the time, Playing the Game was subject to cuts by city and state film censorship boards. For example, the Chicago Board of Censors cut, in Reel 5, the closeup of foreman holding gun against Mexican's heart.

References

External links 
 

1918 films
1918 comedy-drama films
Paramount Pictures films
Films directed by Victor Schertzinger
American black-and-white films
American silent feature films
1910s English-language films
1910s American films
Silent American comedy-drama films